Avianova, LLC was a low cost airline based in Moscow, Russia. From its hub at Sheremetyevo International Airport, the carrier served a number of destinations within Russia, as well as an international destination within Ukraine.

History 

The company was first registered in 2006. It received Russian regulatory approval in August 2009; operations began on 27 August that year. In the beginning, the company advertised their base fares for RUB 250 (less than US$10) excluding taxes and fees. Andrew Pyne, CEO, voiced the strategy of the new company as "flying those Russians who haven't even seen the inside of an airplane in the past twenty years".

, Alfa Group controlled 51% of the stake, while US investment company Indigo Partners held the balance.

Avianova carried 1.3 million passengers in 2010, with an occupation of over 80%. By seat numbers flown it had become the second largest carrier at Sheremetyevo airport with 25% of total capacity, operating out of Terminal B. On monthly traffic statistics it ranked as fourth largest domestic carrier in Russia. It opened a second base at Krasnodar in May 2011, with operations to Sochi, Surgut, and St Petersburg, as well as Moscow. By June 2011, it had carried over 2 million passengers since launch at an average seat factor of nearly 80%.

Shareholder coup and bankruptcy
On the morning of 24 June 2011, representatives of the majority shareholder entered the airline's offices and removed the foreign management and some Russian managers and appointed a new leadership, in a move that CEO Andrew Pyne described as an "illegal coup". The airline's new management in turn accused the previous management of "managerial incompetence, flouting Russian law and inflicting severe financial damage on the company" and appointed Konstantin Teterin, former general manager of Red Wings Airlines, as deputy director general. However, Indigo did not recognize this designation, as it stated the move had "no legal basis". The Russian General Director of the company, Vladimir Gorbunov, himself appointed by Pyne in the Spring of 2008, stated that ″from the very beginning of his co-operation with Avianova, Andrew Pyne demonstrated his unwillingness to work in compliance with Russian laws and emphasised his intention to work solely in accordance with his own rules.″

Destinations
Even though the airline operated from Vnukovo Airport in its beginnings, it moved its hub to Sheremetyevo Airport's Terminal 1 on 28 March 2010.

Avianova served the following destinations before ceasing operations, :

Russia
Anapa - Vityazevo Airport
Arkhangelsk - Talagi Airport
Astrakhan - Narimanovo Airport
Gelendzhik - Gelendzhik Airport
Kaliningrad - Khrabrovo Airport
Krasnodar - Pashkovsky Airport
Kurgan - Kurgan Airport 
Moscow - Sheremetyevo International Airport Hub
Nizhnekamsk - Begishevo Airport
Perm - Bolshoye Savino Airport
Rostov-on-Don - Rostov-on-Don Airport
Saint Petersburg - Pulkovo Airport
Samara - Kurumoch Airport
Sochi - Adler-Sochi International Airport
Stavropol - Stavropol Shpakovskoye Airport
Surgut - Surgut Airport
Tyumen - Roschino International Airport
Ufa - Ufa International Airport
Ulyanovsk - Vostochny Airport
Volgograd - Volgograd International Airport
Yekaterinburg - Koltsovo Airport
Ukraine
Simferopol - Simferopol Airport

Terminated Before Ceasing Operations
Russia – Kazan (suspended), Moscow-Vnukovo

Fleet
Avianova operated 6 Airbus A320 aircraft. In accordance with the growing low-cost aviation market in Russia Avianova stated a long-term view to operate up to 50 aircraft in five years, but this never happened. All Avianova aircraft were registered in the Republic of Ireland.

As of September 2011, the Avianova fleet consisted of the following aircraft with an average age of 10.5 years:

References

External links

Avianova (English website)
Avianova (Russian website)
 Avianova CEO Andrew Pyne Interview with anna.aero

Airlines established in 2009
Airlines disestablished in 2011
Defunct airlines of Russia
Defunct European low-cost airlines
Companies based in Moscow
2011 disestablishments in Russia
Russian companies established in 2009